Thomas Wainwright (1876 – 13 May 1949) was an English footballer who played as a half-back for Burslem Port Vale, Crewe Alexandra, Wellington Town, and Notts County between 1900 and 1906.

Early and personal life
Thomas Wainwright was born in 1876 in the Johnstons Buildings on Beam Street in Nantwich. His father was James Wainwright (1851–1926) who married his mother Mary Ann Simmons (1852–1937) on 3 March 1872 in Nantwich. He was one of nine children, having six brothers and two sisters. Around 1891 he moved from Beam Street to 24 Mill Street, Nantwich, and according to the 1891 census his occupation was a boot clicker. He started his footballing career with Crewe Carriage Works before appearing for Nantwich in The Combination in 1893–94, going on to serve his home town club to the turn of the century. In 1901 the census reports him as a general labourer just before he went on to play football. 

At the end of his professional playing career he married Emily Pitt in Nottingham. They then moved back to Nantwich, living at 22 Mill Street, Nantwich, where he became an engineering labourer, moving on to be a furnace-man at the local railway works. They had five children between 1907 and 1922: Eric, Doris, Leonard, James and Olive.

Thomas Wainwright died in Nantwich on 13 May 1949 from prostate cancer. He is buried in Nantwich cemetery with his wife Emily and daughter Doris.

Career
Wainwright joined Burslem Port Vale in November 1900 and made his debut at the Athletic Ground in a 3–2 win over Barnsley on 1 December. He enjoyed a spell in the first team, and ended the 1900–01 campaign with 14 Second Division appearances to his name. However he then fell out of the first team picture, and was released at the end of the 1901–02 season. He then moved on to Crewe Alexandra, Wellington and Notts County. He finished his playing career back at Nantwich before becoming the club's trainer in 1913.

Career statistics
Source:

References

1876 births
1949 deaths
People from Nantwich
Sportspeople from Cheshire
English footballers
Association football midfielders
Nantwich Town F.C. players
Port Vale F.C. players
Crewe Alexandra F.C. players
Notts County F.C. players
Telford United F.C. players
English Football League players
Association football coaches
Deaths from prostate cancer
Deaths from cancer in England